Chapelle des Buis is a hamlet south of the city of Besançon in Eastern France, straddling the area of the three communes Besançon, Fontain and Morre. The church of Our Lady of Liberation is nearby.

Geography of Doubs
Populated places in Bourgogne-Franche-Comté